The following radio stations broadcast on AM frequency 760 kHz:  WJR in Detroit, Michigan is the only class A station in North America broadcasting on 760 AM; 760 AM is a U.S. clear-channel frequency.

In Argentina 
 LU6 Atlántica in Mar del Plata, Buenos Aires

In Canada 
 CFLD in Burns Lake, British Columbia - 1 kW, transmitter located at

In Mexico 
 XEABC-AM in San Sebastian Chimal, Mexico (state)
 XEDGO-AM in Durango, Durango
 XEEB-AM in Ciudad Obregon, Sonora
 XENY-AM in Nogales, Sonora
 XERA-AM in San Cristóbal de Las Casas, Chiapas
 XEZZ-AM in Guadalajara, Jalisco

In the United States 
Stations in bold are clear-channel stations.

References

Lists of radio stations by frequency